Dan državnosti (Serbo-Croatian for Statehood Day) may refer to:
 Statehood Day (Bosnia and Herzegovina)
 Statehood Day (Croatia)
 Statehood Day (Montenegro)
 Statehood Day (North Macedonia)
 Statehood Day (Slovenia)
 Statehood Day (Serbia)